Esai Easley (born May 9, 2000) is an American soccer player.

Career

Youth 
Easley born in Kailua-Kona, Hawaii played club soccer for local side Kona Crush, before heading to Europe in 2013 for trials with Manchester City, and again in 2014 for trials with Chievo and West Ham United. In 2015, Easley joined the Seattle Sounders FC academy, and then Californian side De Anza Force for their 2017-18 season.

College & amateur 
In 2018, Easley committed to playing college soccer at Grand Canyon University. In four seasons with the 'Lopes, Easley made 43 appearances, scoring two goals and tallying four assists. In 2019, he was named an All-WAC Honorable mention, First team All-WAC in the 2020-2021 season, and WAC Defensive Player of the Year, All-WAC First Team, and was selected to the United Soccer Coaches All-Far West Region Second Team in his senior year in 2021.

While at college, Easley also appeared in the USL League Two with Portland Timbers U23s in 2021, making seven regular season appearances.

Professional 
On January 11, 2022, Easley was selected 22nd overall in the 2022 MLS SuperDraft by Sporting Kansas City. He signed with the club's MLS Next Pro side Sporting Kansas City II on March 11, 2022.

References

External links 
 Esai Easley MLS profile
 Esai Easley - Men's Soccer Esai Easley at GCU Antelopes

Living people
2000 births
American soccer players
Association football defenders
Grand Canyon Antelopes men's soccer players
Major League Soccer players
MLS Next Pro players
Portland Timbers U23s players
Soccer players from Hawaii
Sporting Kansas City draft picks
Sporting Kansas City II players
USL League Two players
People from Kailua-Kona, Hawaii
De Anza Force players